Singles Party (1988–2019) is a compilation album from British-American pop-rock group Shakespears Sister, released on 19 July 2019. It features a remastered collection of all the singles released by the group and two new songs. The deluxe edition containing a second CD with remixes, rarities and previously unreleased material accompanied by a 48-page booklet with photos, new sleeve notes and lyrics was also released the same day. 

The compilation coincided with the announcement of Siobhan Fahey and Marcella Detroit's reunion for the first time in 26 years.

In order to promote the tour and the compilation, a new single titled "All the Queen's Horses" was released on 15 May 2019.

Track listing

Charts

References 

2019 compilation albums
Shakespears Sister albums